Notable persons with the last name Poffenbarger include:

 George Poffenbarger (1861–1951), justice of the West Virginia Supreme Court
 Livia Simpson Poffenbarger (1862–1937), newspaper editor/owner, historian, social and political activist and wife of George Poffenbarger

Notable persons with variants of the name:
 Albert Poffenberger (1885–1977), American psychologist
 Boots Poffenberger (1915–1999), American baseball pitcher
 Virginia Poffenberger (1934–2013), American politician from Iowa

See also
Poffenberger Road Bridge, in Maryland, United States